Bariadi District is one of the five districts of the Simiyu Region of Tanzania, East Africa. As of 2002, the population was 605,509.

History
Prior to 2012, Bariadi District was part of Shinyanga Region.

Economy
The Dutwa Ward contains one of the world's largest nickel deposits.

Wards
As of 2002, Bariadi District was administratively divided into twenty-six wards:

 Bariadi
 Bumera
 Bunamhala
 Chinamili
 Dutwa
 Gamboshi
 Ikungulyabashashi
 Kasoli
 Kinang'weli
 Lagangabilili
 Lugulu
 Mbita
 Mhango
 Mhunze
 Mwadobana
 Mwamapalala
 Mwaswale
 Mwaubingi
 Nkololo
 Nkoma
 Nyakabindi
 Sagata
 Sakwe
 Sapiwi
 Somanda
 Zagayu

Notes

Districts of Simiyu Region

sw:Bariadi